Lippert Peak is a sharp pointed peak at the end of a ridge that extends west from the Douglas Peaks into Horseshoe Valley, located  southeast of Strong Peak (which this peak resembles) in the Heritage Range, Antarctica. It was mapped by the United States Geological Survey from surveys and U.S. Navy air photos from 1961 to 1966, and was named by the Advisory Committee on Antarctic Names for George E. Lippert, a United States Antarctic Research Program  biologist at Palmer Station in 1965.

See also
 Mountains in Antarctica

References

Mountains of Ellsworth Land